The GBR code (or Guy–Blandford–Roycroft code) is a system of representing the position of chess pieces on a chessboard. Publications such as EG use it to classify endgame types and to index endgame studies.

The code is named after Richard Guy, Hugh Blandford and John Roycroft. The first two devised the original system (the Guy–Blandford code) using different figures to represent the number of pieces.  Roycroft suggested to count one for a white piece and three for a black piece in order to make the code easier to memorise.

Definition
In the GBR code, every chess position is represented by six digits, in the following format:
abcd.ef
 a = queens
 b = rooks
 c = bishops
 d = knights
 e = white pawns
 f = black pawns

For the first four digits, each of the first two white pieces counts as 1, and each of the first two black pieces counts as 3. Thus, for example, if White has two knights and Black has one knight, numeral d = 1 + 1 + 3 = 5. If that is all the  other than the kings, the position is classified 0005.  Values 0 through 8 represent all normal permutations of force. 9 is used if either side has three or more pieces of the same non-pawn type; these positions are possible in standard chess due to pawn promotion.

The last two digits of the code represent the number of white and black pawns, respectively.

Usage
GBR code can be used to refer to a general class of material.  For example, the endgame of two knights against pawn (as famously analysed by A.A. Troitsky, leading to his discovery of the Troitsky line), is GBR class 0002.01.

When indexing or referring to specific positions, rather than generalised material imbalances, the code may be extended in various ways. Two common ones are to prefix "+" to indicate the stipulation "White to play and win" or "=" for "White to play and draw"; and to suffix the position of the white and black kings. With these additions, the position to the right, a draw study by Leonid Kubbel (First Prize, Shakhmaty, 1925), is classified as =0323.12g3g1.  (The solution is: 1.Bf2+ Kh1 2.h7 c2+ 3.Be3 Rxe3+ 4.Kf2 Rh3 5.Bd5+ cxd5 6.hxg8=Q Rh2+ 7.Kf3 c1=Q 8.Qg2+ Rxg2.)  The positions of other pieces can also be added; this produces a notation that provides the same information as Forsyth–Edwards Notation.

Examples of GBR code

References
 
 

Chess notation
Chess endgames